Netto-Bådene is an operator of canal tours in the port and canals of Copenhagen, Denmark.

Route
The route begins at Church of Holmen in Slotsholmens Kanal. They enter the main harbor and continues to Nyhavn where they make a call at Heibergsgade /Gammelholm). The boats then cross the harbor to the former 18th century naval base  Holmen before continuing to Langelinie where they make a call at the Little Mermaid. The boat then continues along Nordre Toldbod and Larsens Plads with Amaliehaven before crossing the harbor to enter Christianshavns Kanal from north to south. It then continues to Frederiksholms Kanal on the other side of the harbor which takes it back to Slotholmens Kanal and Church of Holmen.

Boats
The boats are blue as opposed to those white or green boats from Canal Tours and the yellow Copenhagen Harbour Buses. The route is operated with open boats in the summer season and covered boats in the winter time.

Tickets
The ticket prize is DKK 50 for adults and 20 for children. The service is free for Copenhagen Card holders.

References

External links
 Official website

Tourist attractions in Copenhagen
Transport in Copenhagen